Daoud may refer to:

 David in Islam
 Dawud of Kanem, the half-brother of the 14th-century Kanem emperor Idris I of Kanem
 Mohammed Daoud (1901–1984), governor of the province of Helmand in Afghanistan
 Mohammed Daoud Khan (1909–1978), 1st President of Afghanistan
 Ignatius Moses I Daoud (1930–2012), Cardinal Patriarch Emeritus of Antioch
 Hichem Daoud (born 1992), Algerian handball player
 Daoud Kuttab (born 1955), Pakistani journalist

See also
 Daud (disambiguation)
 Dawood (disambiguation)
 Dawoud
 Dawud (disambiguation)
 David (name)